The women's 10,000 metres event at the 1999 European Athletics U23 Championships was held in Göteborg, Sweden, at Ullevi on 30 July 1999.

Medalists

Results

Final
30 July

Participation
According to an unofficial count, 12 athletes from 8 countries participated in the event.

 (1)
 (3)
 (1)
 (1)
 (1)
 (1)
 (3)
 (1)

References

10000 metres
10,000 metres at the European Athletics U23 Championships